Chester Township is the name of some places in the U.S. state of Michigan:

 Chester Township, Eaton County, Michigan
 Chester Township, Otsego County, Michigan
 Chester Township, Ottawa County, Michigan

See also 
 Chester Township (disambiguation)

Michigan township disambiguation pages